is the tenth Japanese single by South Korean girl group Kara. It was released on November 27, 2013 with seven editions. It serves as the lead single for 
their compilation album Best Girls, which was released on the same day. It is the last single to feature former members Nicole Jung and Kang Jiyoung, after their departure from the group's Korean agency, DSP Media, on 2014.

Background
The initial rumors about the single's release started in October, when a South Korean digital store put the single and the album Best Girls for pre-order, with the release day stated for November 27. They were later confirmed by the group's Korean label, DSP Media, and by their Japanese label, Universal Sigma, on October 31. With the confirmation, they revealed track lists, jacket covers and prices for both single and album.

Editions
Limited CD+DVD (UMCK-9641): The limited CD+DVD edition includes the CD single and a DVD including music video of "French Kiss", a close-up version and making of it.
Regular CD only (UMCK-5450): The regular CD only edition includes only the CD single itself.
Limited Solo CD+DVD (PDCS-5907 - 5911): The limited solo CD+DVD editions includes the standard CD single track list and a DVD featuring solo shots and making of from the music video of "French Kiss", one edition per member. These editions of the single were only sold at Universal Music Japan's digital store.

Composition
"French Kiss" was written by Shirose, who also composed the song with Heroism and Hikki. "Girlfriend", b-side of the single, was written by Glory Face, who also composed and arranged the song, and Jam-9. This is the first time that a Japanese single of Kara does not include a bonus track.

Music video
A short version of the music video of "French Kiss" was released in November 12, on Kara's Japan YouTube account. The full version aired in November 15, on the music TV channel M-On!. It was directed by Hong Won-ki.

Track listing

Chart performance

Oricon chart

Billboard charts

Release history

References

Songs about kissing
2013 singles
Japanese-language songs
Kara (South Korean group) songs
Dance-pop songs
2013 songs
Song recordings produced by her0ism